Hinduja Healthcare Limited is a business vertical and philanthropic arm of London-based Hinduja Group. It owns and operates the Hinduja Hospital and Hinduja Healthcare Surgical, both located in Mumbai.  Its Chief Executive Officer is Gautam Khanna.

It has plans to expand its nationwide capacity to 5,000 beds, besides setting up radiology and pathology diagnostic centres, emergency ambulance services and pharmacy retail outlets across India. It is also working with the Biomedical Engineering and Technology (incubation) Centre (BETiC) of IIT Bombay to co-develop and commercialise biomedical devices.

Notable doctors
 B. K. Misra - Neurosurgeon
Gustad Daver - Cardio-thoracic, vascular and transplant surgeon
 Indira Hinduja - Gynaecologist
 Luis Jose De Souza - Surgical oncologist
 Milind Vasant Kirtane - Otorhinolaryngologist
Rasik Shah - Paediatric surgeon & Urologist
Sanjay Agarwala - Orthopaedic surgeon
Sultan Pradhan - Surgical oncologist
 Suresh Advani - Medical oncologist
 Tehemton Erach Udwadia - Gastroenterologist
 Zarir Udwadia - Pulmonologist

References 

Hinduja Group